Montana State University–Northern (MSU–Northern or Northern) is a public college in Havre, Montana.  It is part of the Montana University System and was Northern Montana College prior to the restructuring of Montana's public university system in 1994.

History
In 1913, the Montana State Legislature approved the establishment of the Northern Montana Agricultural and Manual Training School at Fort Assinniboine, six miles southwest of Havre, but no money was actually appropriated. The state legislature amended their original act in 1927 to include certain academic subjects and in 1929, the legislature appropriated funds to establish the college as a branch of the University of Montana (later renamed the Montana University System). Northern Montana College opened its doors in September 1929 in temporary quarters in Havre High School, and moved to its present campus in 1932.

Athletics
The Montana State–Northern athletic teams are called the Lights and Skylights. The university is a member of the National Association of Intercollegiate Athletics (NAIA), primarily competing in the Frontier Conference for most of its sports since the 1935–36 academic year; while its rodeo teams compete in the National Intercollegiate Rodeo Association (NIRA).

Montana State–Northern competes in 11 intercollegiate varsity sports: Men's sports include basketball, cross country, football, golf, rodeo and wrestling; while women's sports include basketball, cross country, golf, rodeo and volleyball.

Notable people
 Hunter Azure Is an American mixed martial artist who on 7/9/2019 won a fight against Chris Ocon on Dana White's Contender Series - Season 3, Episode 3.  Hunter wrestled for Northern.
 Jacob Bachmeier, one of the youngest state legislators in the United States. He graduated from Havre High School and currently attends Montana State University–Northern.
 Michael Claxton, former professional basketball coach and former professional basketball player, graduated from MSU–Northern in 2001.
 Garrison Courtney former Chief of Public Affairs for the Drug Enforcement Administration, attended MSU–Northern in 1996.
 Ryan Divish, journalist for the Seattle Times
 Jesse Juarez is an American mixed martial artist who was a two-time NAIA All-American and was a 2005 NAIA National Champion wrestler for the Northern Lights.
 Kingsley Ogwudire formerly with the Harlem Globetrotters and longtime member of the Nigeria national basketball team played basketball for the Northern Lights.
 Michael Rao current president of Virginia Commonwealth University, served as MSU–Northern Chancellor 1998–2000.
 Flint Rasmussen at one time served as the Public Address announcer for the Lights and Skylights basketball teams.
 Lawrence Romo former director of the Selective Service System, received his Master of Education degree from MSU–Northern.
  Jerome Souers Is the current Head Football Coach at MSU-Northern. He is the former Head Coach at Northern Arizona University.
  Bruce Thompson (Georgia politician) is currently a Georgia Labor Commissioner. Received an Associate Degree in Business in 1985.
  Emmett Willson was awarded the 2004 Dan Hodge Trophy, while wrestling for MSU–Northern.
 James Welch known for the novel Winter in the Blood briefly attended Northern Montana College.
 Sherry Winn former Olympian, college basketball coach, current author and motivational speaker, coached the Skylights women's basketball team for five years.

See also
 List of college athletic programs in Montana

References

External links
 
 Official athletics website

 
Montana State University System
Educational institutions established in 1929
Universities and colleges accredited by the Northwest Commission on Colleges and Universities
Education in Hill County, Montana
Buildings and structures in Hill County, Montana
Frontier Conference
1929 establishments in Montana
Public universities and colleges in Montana